The University of Tennessee Gardens are botanical gardens located across the State of Tennessee. They are part of the University of Tennessee Institute of Agriculture.

References

See also
 List of botanical gardens in the United States

Botanical gardens in Tennessee
Protected areas of Weakley County, Tennessee
Botanical gardens